Nicolás Ezequiel Gorosito (born 17 August 1988) is an Argentine footballer who plays as a central defender for Slovak club Dukla Banská Bystrica.

Club career

Early career
Born in Santa Fe, Gorosito joined Ben Hur in 2007 from Independiente de Tandil. After making his professional debut in the 2007–08 season in Primera B Nacional (also suffering relegation), he returned to the latter club in 2010.

Slovakia
In 2011, after a short spell with Sportivo Belgrano, Gorosito moved abroad for the first time in his career, after agreeing to a contract with Corgoň liga club Senica. He made his debut for the club on 26 February, in a 3–0 home win against Dukla Banská Bystrica.

Gorosito scored his first goal abroad on 23 July 2011, but in a 3–2 away loss against Slovan Bratislava. On 18 June 2012, he completed a move to the latter club for an undisclosed fee, on a four-year contract.

Getafe
On 14 June 2016, free agent Gorosito signed a one-year deal with Getafe  in Segunda División. On 8 July 2017, after contributing with one goal in 27 appearances as his side achieved promotion to La Liga, he renewed his contract for a further season.

Albacete
On 13 January 2018, after making no league appearances during the first half of the campaign, Gorosito signed an 18-month contract with Albacete in the second division. He left the club in 2021, after suffering relegation.

Alcorcón
On 25 July 2021, Gorosito agreed to a deal with AD Alcorcón, also in the Spanish second division.

References

External links

1988 births
Living people
Footballers from Santa Fe, Argentina
Argentine footballers
Association football defenders
Sportivo Belgrano footballers
Slovak Super Liga players
FK Senica players
ŠK Slovan Bratislava players
Segunda División players
Getafe CF footballers
Albacete Balompié players
AD Alcorcón footballers
MFK Dukla Banská Bystrica players
Argentine expatriate footballers
Argentine expatriate sportspeople in Slovakia
Argentine expatriate sportspeople in Spain
Expatriate footballers in Slovakia
Expatriate footballers in Spain